Lugdi or Lugri (Hindi: लुगड़ी) is an alcoholic drink produced North Indian state of Himachal Pradesh. It is traditionally prepared from cooked cereal grains, especially rice or barley. It is prepared by boiling barley grains or rice and some local herb known as Phab in water and then fermenting the material. The cereals are left in mesophilic conditions for fermentation and consumed undistilled. It is consumed by many local tribes in Himachal Pradesh, such as Kinnara, Lahaula, Swangia and Pangwala.

It is usually made during the summer season, as the weather and environment help the fermentation process. The drink is reserved for the winter season as it helps to keep the body warm. It is consumed  on festive occasions, religious festivals and other social gatherings.

In 1965, a report published by the Planning Commission, Government of India, noted that there was a ban on the sale of Lugdi, but it was being sold despite the ban.

In popular culture 
The drink was featured in the 2013's Ranbir Kapoor and Deepika Padukone starrer Hindi film Yeh Jawaani Hai Deewani.

See also 
 Chulli
 Feni (liquor)
 Sonti (rice drink)
 Rice wine
 List of Indian drinks

References

Indian alcoholic drinks
Indian distilled drinks
Traditional Indian alcoholic beverages
Adulteration
Alcohol in India